"Yellow Hearts" is the debut single by American pop singer Ant Saunders which was self-released on June 18, 2019, and re-released by Arista Records in November 2019. The song gained popularity on the video-sharing platform TikTok, which led to it gaining over 100 million streams across all platforms collectively.

Reception

Music video 
Saunders released the Idle House directed music video for the track on December 10, 2019.

Credits and personnel 
Credits adapted from Tidal.

 Anthony Saunders – vocals, songwriting, production

Audrey Mika version
 Anthony Saunders – vocals, songwriting, production
 Audrey Mika Armacost – vocals, songwriting
 Amisha Mallick Sarkar – songwriting
 Nathaniel Alford – vocal production
 Dale Becker – mastering
 Armin Lopez – assistant engineering

Charts

Certifications

Release history

References 

2019 songs
2019 debut singles